In the signage industry, neon signs are electric signs lighted by long luminous gas-discharge tubes that contain rarefied neon or other gases. They are the most common use for neon lighting, which was first demonstrated in a modern form in December 1910 by Georges Claude at the Paris Motor Show. While they are used worldwide, neon signs were popular in the United States from about the 1920s to 1950s. The installations in Times Square, many originally designed by Douglas Leigh, were famed, and there were nearly 2,000 small shops producing neon signs by 1940. In addition to signage, neon lighting is used frequently by artists and architects, and (in a modified form) in plasma display panels and televisions. The signage industry has declined in the past several decades, and cities are now concerned with preserving and restoring their antique neon signs.

Light emitting diode arrays can be formed to simulate the appearance of neon lamps.

History

The neon sign is an evolution of the earlier Geissler tube, which is a sealed glass tube containing a "rarefied" gas (the gas pressure in the tube is well below atmospheric pressure). When a voltage is applied to electrodes inserted through the glass, an electrical glow discharge results. Geissler tubes were popular in the late 19th century, and the different colors they emitted were characteristics of the gases within. They were unsuitable for general lighting, as the pressure of the gas inside typically declined with use. The direct predecessor of neon tube lighting was the Moore tube, which used nitrogen or carbon dioxide as the luminous gas and a patented mechanism for maintaining pressure. Moore tubes were sold for commercial lighting for a number of years in the early 1900s. 

The discovery of neon in 1898 by British  scientists William Ramsay and Morris W. Travers included the observation of a brilliant red glow in Geissler tubes. Travers wrote, "the blaze of crimson light from the tube told its own story and was a sight to dwell upon and never forget." Following neon's discovery, neon tubes were used as scientific instruments and novelties. A sign created by Perley G. Nutting and displaying the word "neon" may have been shown at the Louisiana Purchase Exposition of 1904, although this claim has been disputed; in any event, the scarcity of neon would have precluded the development of a lighting product. After 1902, Georges Claude's company in France, Air Liquide, began producing industrial quantities of neon, essentially as a byproduct of their air liquefaction business. This demonstration lit a peristyle of the Grand Palais (a large exhibition hall). Claude's associate, Jacques Fonsèque, realized the possibilities for a business based on signage and advertising. By 1913 a large sign for the vermouth Cinzano illuminated the night sky in Paris, and by 1919 the entrance to the Paris Opera was adorned with neon tube lighting. Over the next several years, patents were granted to Claude for two innovations still used today: a "bombardment" technique to remove impurities from the working gas of a sealed sign, and a design for the internal electrodes of the sign that prevented their degradation by sputtering.

In 1923, Georges Claude and his French company Claude Neon introduced neon gas signs to the United States by selling two to a Packard car dealership in Los Angeles. Earle C. Anthony purchased the two signs reading "Packard" for $1,250 apiece. Neon lighting quickly became a popular fixture in outdoor advertising. The signsdubbed "liquid fire"were visible in daylight; people would stop and stare.

What may be the oldest surviving neon  sign in the United States, still in use for its original purpose, is the sign “Theatre” (1929) at the Lake Worth Playhouse in Lake Worth Beach, Florida.

The next major technological innovation in neon lighting and signs was the development of fluorescent tube coatings. Jacques Risler received a French patent in 1926 for these. Neon signs that use an argon/mercury gas mixture emit a good deal of ultraviolet light. When this light is absorbed by a fluorescent coating, preferably inside the tube, the coating (called a "phosphor") glows with its own color. While only a few colors were initially available to sign designers, after the Second World War, phosphor materials were researched intensively for use in color televisions. About two dozen colors were available to neon sign designers by the 1960s, and today there are nearly 100 available colors.

Fabrication

Neon tube signs
are produced by the craft of bending glass tubing into shapes. A worker skilled in this craft is known as a glass bender, neon bender or tube bender. The neon tube is made out of 4 or 5-foot long straight sticks of hollow glass sold by sign suppliers to neon shops worldwide, where they are manually assembled into individual custom designed and fabricated lamps.

Tubing in external diameters ranging from about 8–15 mm with a 1 mm wall thickness is most commonly used, although 6 mm tubing is now commercially available in colored glass tubes. The tube is heated in sections using several types of burners that are selected according to the amount of glass to be heated for each bend. These burners include ribbon, cannon, or crossfires, as well as a variety of  gas torches. Ribbon burners are strips of fire that make the gradual bends, while crossfires are used to make sharp bends.

The interior of the tubes may be coated with a thin phosphorescent powder coating, affixed to the interior wall of the tube by a binding material. The tube is filled with a purified gas mixture, and the gas ionized by a high voltage applied between the ends of the sealed tube through cold cathodes welded onto the ends. The color of the light emitted by the tube may be just that coming from the gas, or the light from the phosphor layer. Different phosphor-coated tubing sections may be butt welded together using glass working torches to form a single tube of varying colors, for effects such as a sign where each letter displays a different color letter within a single word.

"Neon" is used to denote the general type of lamp, but neon gas is only one of the types of tube gases principally used in commercial application.  Pure neon gas is used to produce only about one-third of the colors (mostly shades of red and orange, and some warmer or more intense shades of pink). The greatest number of colors (including all shades of blue, yellow, green, violet, and white, as well as some cooler or softer shades of pink) produced by filling with another inert gas, argon, and a drop of mercury (Hg) which is added to the tube immediately after purification. When the tube is ionized by electrification, the mercury evaporates into mercury vapor, which fills the tube and produces strong ultraviolet light.  The ultraviolet light thus produced excites the various phosphor coatings designed to produce different colors.  Even though this class of neon tubes use no neon at all, they are still denoted as "neon."  Mercury-bearing lamps are a type of cold-cathode fluorescent lamps.

Each type of neon tubing produces two different possible colors, one with neon gas and the other with argon/mercury. Some "neon" tubes are made without phosphor coatings for some of the colors.  Clear tubing filled with neon gas produces the ubiquitous yellowish orange color with the interior plasma column clearly visible, and is the cheapest and simplest tube to make. Traditional neon glasses in America over 20 years old are lead glass that are easy to soften in gas fires, but recent environmental and health concerns of the workers has prompted manufacturers to seek more environmentally safe special soft glass formulas. One of the vexing problems avoided this way is lead glass' tendency to burn into a black spot emitting lead fumes in a bending flame too rich in the fuel/oxygen mixture.  Another traditional line of glasses was colored soda lime glasses coming in a myriad of glass color choices, which produce the highest quality, most hypnotically vibrant and saturated hues. Still more color choices are afforded in either coating, or not coating, these colored glasses with the various available exotic phosphors.

Long lifetime

A wide range of colors and the ability to make a tube that can last for years or decades without replacement contributes to the long lifetime of these bulbs. Since these tubes require so much custom labor, they would have very little economic viability if they did not have such a long lifetime when well processed. The intensity of neon light produced increases as the tube diameter grows smaller, that is, the intensity varies inversely with the square root of the interior diameter of the tubing, and the resistance of the tube increases as the tubing diameter decreases accordingly, because tube ionization is greatest at the center of the tube, and the ions migrate to and are recaptured and neutralized at the tube walls. The greatest cause of neon tube failure is the gradual absorption of neon gas by high voltage ion implantation into the interior glass walls of the tubes which depletes the gas, and eventually causes the tube resistance to rise to a level that it can no longer light at the rated voltage, but this may take well over 50 years if the tube is properly processed during bombardment and gas back-filling.

This long lifetime has created a practical market for neon use for interior architectural cove lighting in a wide variety of uses including homes, where the tube can be bent to any shape, fitted in a small space, and can do so without requiring tube replacement for a decade or more.

Tube bending

A section of the glass is heated until it is malleable; then it is bent into shape and aligned to a neon sign pattern paper containing the graphics or lettering to which the final product will conform.   A tube bender corks off the hollow tube before heating and holds a latex rubber blow hose at the other end, through which he gently presses a small amount of air to keep the tube diameter constant as it is bending. The trick of bending is to bend one small section or bend at a time, heating one part of the tubing so that it is soft, without heating some other part of the tube as well, which would make the bend uncontrollable. A bend, once the glass is heated, must be brought to the pattern and fitted rapidly before the glass hardens again, because it is difficult to reheat once completely cooled without risking breakage. It is frequently necessary to skip one or more bends and come back to it later, by measuring carefully along the length of the tube.  One tube letter may contain 7–10 small bends, and mistakes are not easily corrected without going back and starting all over again. If more tubing is required, another piece is welded onto it, or the parts can be all welded onto each other at the final step. The finished tube must be vacuum tight and clean inside in order to operate.  Once the tube is filled with mercury, if any mistake is made after that, the entire tube should be started over anew, because breathing heated mercury-impregnated glass and phosphor causes long term heavy metal poisoning in neon workers. Sticks of tubing are joined until the tube reaches an impractical size, and several tubes are joined in series with the high voltage neon transformer.  Extreme ends of the electrical circuit must be isolated from each other to prevent tube puncture and buzzing from corona effect.

Bombardment

A cold cathode electrode is melted (or welded) to each end of the tube as it is finished. The hollow electrodes are also traditionally lead glass and contain a small metal shell with two wires protruding through the glass to which the sign wiring will later be attached. All welds and seals must be leak-proof at high vacuum before proceeding further.

The tube is attached to a manifold which is then attached to a high-quality vacuum pump. The tube is then evacuated of air until it reaches a vacuum level of a few torr. The evacuation is paused, and a high current is forced through the low-pressure air in the tube via the electrodes (in a process known as "bombarding"). This current and voltage is far above the level that occurs in final operation of the tube.  The current depends on the specific electrodes used and the diameter of the tube but is typically in the 150 mA to 1,500 mA range, starting low and increasing towards the end of the process to ensure that the electrodes are adequately heated without melting the glass tube. The bombarding current is provided by a large transformer with an open-circuit voltage of roughly 15,000VAC to 23,000VAC. The bombarding transformer acts as an adjustable constant current source, and the actual voltage during operation depends on the length and pressure of the tube. Typically the operator will maintain the pressure as high as the bombarder will allow to ensure maximum power dissipation and heating. Bombarding transformers may be specially made for this use, or may be repurposed electrical utility distribution transformers (the type seen mounted on utility poles) operated backwards to produce a high voltage output.

This very high power dissipation in the tube heats the glass walls to a temperature of several hundred degrees Celsius, and any dirt and impurities within are drawn off in the gasified form by the vacuum pump.  The greatest impurities that are driven off this way are the gases that coat the inside wall of the tubing by adsorption, mainly oxygen, carbon dioxide, and especially water vapor. The current also heats the electrode metal to over 600 °C, producing a bright orange incandescent color.  The cathodes are prefabricated hollow metal shells with a small opening (sometimes a ceramic donut aperture) which contains in the interior surface of the shell a light dusting of a cold cathode low work function powder (usually a powder ceramic molar eutectic point mixture including BaCO2), combined with other alkaline earth oxides, which reduces to BaO2 when heated to about 500 degrees F, and reduces the work function of the electrode for cathodic emission. Barium Oxide has a work function of roughly 2 eV whereas tungsten at room temperature has a work of 4.0 eV.  This represents the cathode drop or electron energy required to remove electrons from the surface of the cathode.  This avoids the necessity of using a hot wire thermoelectric cathode such as is used in conventional fluorescent lamps.  And for that reason, neon tubes are extremely long lived when properly processed, in contrast to fluorescent tubing, because there is no wire filament as there is in a fluorescent tube to burn out like a common light bulb. The principal purpose of doing this is to purify the interior of the tube before the tube is sealed off so that when it is operated, these gases and impurities are not driven off and released by the plasma and the heat generated into the sealed tube, which would quickly burn the metal cathodes and mercury droplets (if pumped with argon/mercury) and oxidize the interior gases and cause immediate tube failure.  The more thorough the purification of the tube is, the longer lasting and stable the tube will be in actual operation. Once these gases and impurities are liberated under pre-filling bombardment into the tube interior they are quickly evacuated by the pump.

While still attached to the manifold, the tube is allowed to cool while pumping down to the lowest pressure the system can achieve. It is then filled to a low pressure of a few torrs (millimeters of mercury) with one of the noble gases, or a mixture of them, and sometimes a small amount of mercury. This gas fill pressure represents roughly 1/100th of the pressure of the atmosphere. Neon or argon are the most common gases used; krypton, xenon, and helium are used by artists for special purposes but are not used alone in normal signs. A premixed combination of argon and helium is often used in lieu of pure argon when a tube is to be installed in a cold climate, since the helium increases voltage drop (and thus power dissipation), warming the tube to operating temperature faster. Neon glows bright red or reddish orange when lit. When argon or argon/helium is used, a tiny droplet of mercury is added. Argon by itself is very dim pale lavender when lit, but the droplet of mercury fills the tube with mercury vapor when sealed, which then emits ultraviolet light upon electrification. This ultraviolet emission allows finished argon/mercury tubes to glow with a variety of bright colors when the tube has been coated on the interior with ultraviolet-sensitive phosphors after being bent into shape.

Heat processed neon tubes

An alternative way of processing finished neon tubes has also been used.  Because the only purpose of bombardment by electrical means is to purify the interior of tubes, it is also possible to produce a tube by heating the tube externally either with a torch or with an oven, while heating the electrode with a radio frequency induction heating (RFIH) coil.  While this is less productive, it creates a cleaner custom tube with significantly less cathode damage, longer life and brilliance, and can produce tubes of very small sizes and diameters, down to 6mm OD. The tube is heated thoroughly under high vacuum without external electrical application, until the outgassed gases can be seen to have been totally depleted and the pressure drops to a high vacuum again. Then the tube is filled, sealed and the mercury dropped and shaken.

Electrical wiring

The finished glass pieces are illuminated by either a neon sign transformer or a switched-mode power supply, usually  running at voltages ranging between 2–15 kV and currents between 18 and 30 mA (higher currents available on special order.)    These power supplies operate as constant-current sources (a high voltage supply with a very high internal impedance), since the tube has a negative characteristic electrical impedance. Standard tube tables established in the early days of neon are still used that specify the gas fill pressures, in either Ne or Hg/Ar, as a function of tube length in feet, tube diameter and transformer voltage.

The standard traditional neon transformer, a magnetic shunt transformer, is a special non-linear type designed to keep the voltage across the tube raised to whatever level is necessary to produce the fixed current needed. The voltage drop of a tube is proportional to length and so the maximum voltage and length of tubing fed from a given transformer is limited. Generally, the loaded voltage drops to about 800 VAC at full  current. The short-circuit current is about the same.

Compact high frequency inverter-converter transformers developed in the early 1990s are used, especially when low Radio Frequency Interference (RFI) is needed, such as in locations near high-fidelity sound equipment.  At the typical frequency of these solid state transformers, the plasma electron-ion recombination time is too long to extinguish and reignite the plasma at each cycle, unlike the case at power line frequency. The plasma does not broadcast high frequency switching noise and remains ionized continually, becoming radio noise free.

The most common current rating is 30 mA for general use, with 60 mA used for high-brightness applications like channel letters or architectural lighting.  120 mA sources are occasionally seen in illuminating applications, but are uncommon since special electrodes are required to withstand the current, and an accidental shock from a 120 mA transformer is much more likely to be fatal than from the lower current supplies.

The efficiency of neon lighting ranges between that of ordinary incandescent lights and that of fluorescent lamps, depending on color. On a per-watt basis, incandescents produce 10 to 20 lumens, while fluorescents produce 50 to 100 lumens. Neon light efficiency ranges from 10 lumens per watt for red, up to 60 lumens for green and blue when these colors result from internal phosphor coatings.

Blocking out and coating

A highly opaque special black or gray glass paint can be used to "black out" parts of a tube, as between letters of a word.

In most mass-produced low-priced signs today, clear glass tubing is coated with translucent paint to produce colored light.  In this way, several different colors can be produced inexpensively from a single glowing tube.  Over time, elevated temperatures, thermal cycling, or exposure to weather may cause the colored coating to flake off the glass or change its hue. A more expensive alternative is to use high-quality colored glass tubing, which retains a more stable appearance as it ages.

Applications
Light-emitting tubes form colored lines with which a text can be written or a picture drawn, including various decorations, especially in advertising and commercial signage. By programming sequences of switching parts on and off, there are many possibilities for dynamic light patterns that form animated images.

In some applications, neon tubes are increasingly being replaced with LEDs, given the steady advance in LED luminosity  and decreasing cost of high-brightness LEDs. However, proponents of neon technology maintain that they still have significant advantages over LEDs.

Neon illumination is valuable to invoke the 1940s or 1950s nostalgia in marketing and in the historic restoration of architectural landmarks from the neon era. Architecture in the streamline moderne era often deployed neon to accent structural pigmented glass built into the façade of a 1930s or 1940s structure; many of these buildings now qualify for inclusion on historic registers such as the U.S. National Register of Historic Places if their historic integrity is faithfully maintained.

Gallery

See also
 Crackle tube
 Plasma globe
 Pundit Light
 Westinghouse Sign
 Timeline of lighting technology
 Neon Museum, Warsaw

References

Further reading
 
 
  Article about neon signage's flowering and decline in Warsaw and Poland.
 
  – industry standard reference on practices, methods, and technologies used by neon fabricators

External links

 Collection of photographs of Swedish neon signs; text in Swedish.
 Website of an organization devoted to preserving Polish neon signs; in English.

Signage
Signage
Articles containing video clips
1910 introductions